The Bachelor UK 2012 was the fifth series of the reality television series The Bachelor, featuring Spencer Matthews (of Made in Chelsea fame) as "The Bachelor". The series is aired again on Channel 5.

Contestants
The 24 contestants were as follows:

* at time of competition

Call-Out Order

 The contestant was eliminated at the rose ceremony
 The contestant went on two-on-one date and was given a rose prior to the Rose Ceremony
 The contestant was on a one-on-one date and was eliminated
 The contestant was given a rose at the Rose Ceremony and rejected it
 The contestant was on a two-on-one date and got eliminated
 The contestant was given a rose prior to the Rose Ceremony 
 The contestant won the competition

Ratings
Episode Viewing figures from BARB.

References

External links

2012 British television seasons
UK 05